Jeffrey or Geoffrey Gordon may refer to:

 Jeffrey I. Gordon (c. 1947), American biologist
 J. D. Gordon (born 1967), former U.S. Navy public affairs officer, Herman Cain presidential campaign staffer
 Jeff Gordon (Jeffery, born 1971), American race car driver
 Geoffrey Gordon (composer) (born 1968), recipient of the Aaron Copland Award 2008-09
 Geoffrey Gordon (composer) (1952–2012), worked on Best Laid Plans album
 Geoffrey Gordon (computer scientist), developed Gordon's Programmable Simulation System for IBM in the 1960s
 Geoffrey J. Gordon, computer scientist, director of Microsoft Montreal research lab, professor at Carnegie Mellon